Vincent Russo may refer to:

 Vince Russo (born 1961), American author, professional wrestling booker and pundit
 Vincent M. Russo (born 1930), United States Army general